Amore che vieni, amore che vai is a 2008  Italian crime-drama film directed by Daniele Costantini. It is based on the novel  Un destino ridicolo by Fabrizio De André and Alessandro Gennari.

Plot 
In 1963 Genoa, bartender Carlo is fired for having saved prostitute Luciana from her pimp's violent behaviour. Following that, the girl makes a proposal to Carlo to be a pimp to her and two colleagues of hers. Carlo asks approval to his mother Lina to perform this new job of his, and he obtains it after some initial hostility from her.

At the same time Carlo falls in love with Maritza, a new girl in town (freely based on Bocca di Rosa, the protagonist of De André's eponymous song from 1967).

Elsewhere, Salvatore, a shepherd from Sardinia who has just been released from prison, also falls in love with Veretta, one of Carlo's girls. The pair find themselves involved in a big heist on account of local criminal boss Bernard.

The next day, after having intercepted and skillfully stolen a smuggled truckload of money by masquerading as Carabinieri, Carlo and Bernard stumble upon Salvatore's corpse and realize that the smuggled funds have been stolen from them.

In the meantime, Carlo, not being able to locate Maritza any longer, goes out of his mind and starts suspecting everybody of having kidnapped her.

In a surprise plot twist, it is revealed that the money was stolen by Salvatore, who also took the chance to kill his twin brother - because of whom he had unjustly been jailed for five years.

However, while escaping on a train, Salvatore has a change of heart and confesses his theft and his murder to a man whom he erroneously believes to be a priest, but who is actually a hitman working for Bernard. Salvatore is "absolved" by the fake priest and gives him all of the money he stole. Soon afterwards, the man shoots him and dumps his corpse from a train window.

Cast 
Fausto Paravidino as Carlo
Filippo Nigro as  Salvatore
Massimo Popolizio as  Bernard
Donatella Finocchiaro as  Veretta
Tosca D'Aquino as  Luciana
Claudia Zanella as  Maritza
Agostina Belli as  Lina
Giorgia Ferrero as Antonia
Davide Paganini as Vichingo

See also
 List of Italian films of 2008

References

External links

2008 films
Italian crime drama films
2008 crime drama films
Films about prostitution in Italy
Films scored by Nicola Piovani
2000s Italian films